Bezirk Leibnitz is a district of the state of Styria in Austria. Since the 2015 Styria municipal structural reform, it consists of the following municipalities:

 Allerheiligen bei Wildon
 Arnfels
 Ehrenhausen an der Weinstraße
 Empersdorf
 Gabersdorf
 Gamlitz
 Gleinstätten
 Gralla
 Großklein
 Heiligenkreuz am Waasen
 Heimschuh
 Hengsberg
 Kitzeck im Sausal
 Lang
 Lebring-Sankt Margarethen
 Leibnitz
 Leutschach an der Weinstraße
 Oberhaag
 Ragnitz
 Sankt Andrä-Höch
 Sankt Georgen an der Stiefing
 Sankt Johann im Saggautal
 Sankt Nikolai im Sausal
 Sankt Veit in der Südsteiermark
 Schwarzautal
 Straß in Steiermark
 Tillmitsch
 Wagna
 Wildon

Municipalities before 2015
Towns (Städte) are indicated in boldface; market towns (Marktgemeinden) in italics; suburbs, hamlets and other subdivisions of a municipality are indicated in small characters.
 Allerheiligen bei Wildon
Großfeiting, Kleinfeiting, Pesendorf, Pichla, Schwasdorf, Siebing
Arnfels
Maltschach
 Berghausen
Ewitsch, Wielitsch, Zieregg
 Breitenfeld am Tannenriegel
 Ehrenhausen
 Eichberg-Trautenburg
Kranach
 Empersdorf
Liebensdorf
 Gabersdorf
Landscha an der Mur, Neudorf an der Mur, Sajach
 Gamlitz
Eckberg, Grubtal, Kranach, Labitschberg, Sernau, Steinbach
 Glanz an der Weinstraße
Fötschach, Glanz, Langegg, Pößnitz
 Gleinstätten
Haslach, Prarath
 Gralla
 Großklein
Burgstall, Goldes, Mantrach, Mattelsberg, Nestelbach, Nestelberg, Oberfahrenbach
 Hainsdorf im Schwarzautal
Matzelsdorf, Techensdorf
 Heiligenkreuz am Waasen
Felgitsch
 Heimschuh
Kittenberg, Muggenau, Nestelberg, Pernitsch, Unterfahrenbach
 Hengsberg
Flüssing, Kehlsdorf, Komberg, Kühberg, Leitersdorf, Matzelsdorf, Schönberg an der Laßnitz, Schrötten an der Laßnitz
 Kaindorf an der Sulm
Grottenhof, Kaindorf an der Sulm, Kogelberg
 Kitzeck im Sausal
Brudersegg, Einöd, Fresing, Gauitsch, Greith, Neurath, Steinriegel
 Lang
Dexenberg, Göttling, Jöß, Langaberg, Schirka, Stangersdorf
 Lebring-Sankt Margarethen
Bachsdorf, Lebring, Sankt Margarethen bei Lebring
 Leibnitz
 Leutschach
 Oberhaag
Altenbach, Hardegg, Kitzelsdorf, Krast, Lieschen, Obergreith
 Obervogau
 Pistorf
Dornach, Maierhof, Sausal
 Ragnitz
Badendorf, Edelsee, Gundersdorf, Haslach an der Stiefing, Laubegg, Oberragnitz, Oedt, Rohr
 Ratsch an der Weinstraße
Ottenberg
 Retznei
Unterlupitscheni
 Sankt Andrä-Höch
Brünngraben, Fantsch, Höch, Neudorf im Sausal, Reith, Rettenberg, Sankt Andrä im Sausal, Sausal
 Sankt Georgen an der Stiefing
Baldau, Gerbersdorf, Kurzragnitz, Lappach, Prentern, Stiefing, Stiefingberg
 Sankt Johann im Saggautal
Eichberg, Gündorf, Narrath, Praratheregg, Radiga, Saggau, Untergreith
 Sankt Nikolai im Sausal
Flamberg, Greith, Grötsch, Lamperstätten, Mitteregg, Mollitsch, Oberjahring, Petzles, Unterjahring, Waldschach
 Sankt Nikolai ob Draßling
Hütt, Leitersdorf, Marchtring
 Sankt Ulrich am Waasen
Wutschdorf
 Sankt Veit am Vogau
Labuttendorf, Lind, Lipsch, Neutersdorf, Rabenhof, Wagendorf
 Schloßberg
Großwalz, Remschnigg
 Seggauberg
Oberlupitscheni, Rettenbach, Schönegg
 Spielfeld
Graßnitzberg, Obegg
 Stocking
Afram, Alla, Aug, Hart bei Wildon, Neudorf, Sukdull
 Straß in Steiermark
Gersdorf an der Mur
 Sulztal an der Weinstraße
Sulztal
 Tillmitsch
Altenberg bei Leibnitz, Grössing, Maxlon, Neutillmitsch, Steingrub
 Vogau
 Wagna
Aflenz an der Sulm, Hasendorf an der Mur, Leitring
 Weitendorf
Kainach bei Wildon, Lichendorf, Neudorf ob Wildon
 Wildon
 Wolfsberg im Schwarzautal
Marchtring, Wölferberg

References

 
Districts of Styria